Japigny kirschbaum is a species of glass knifefish described in 2011 from the Approuague, Mana and Maroni rivers in French Guiana. It is the only member of its genus.

Etymology
The knifefish is named in honor of Frank Kirschbaum, of the Humboldt University of Berlin. He was a specialist in gymnotiform fishes because he had spawned and bred several species in the laboratory.

References

Sternopygidae
Fish of French Guiana
Endemic fauna of French Guiana
Taxa named by François-Jean Meunier
Taxa named by Michel Louis Arthur Marie Ange François Jégu
Taxa named by Philippe Keith
Fish described in 2011